The 2022 Asian Canoe Sprint Championships were the 18th Asian Canoe Sprint Championships and took place from 24 to 26 March 2022 at the RCAT Rowing and Canoeing Training Center in Rayong, Thailand.

Medal summary

Men

Women

Medal table

References

External links
Asian Canoe Confedeation
Results

Canoe Sprint Championships
Asian Canoe Sprint Championships
Asian Canoeing Championships
International sports competitions hosted by Thailand
Asian Canoe Sprint Championships